Robert Vikestad (born 15 December 1983) is a Norwegian former professional footballer who played as a forward for Bodø/Glimt. He signed for Bodø/Glimt from Ranheim in the 2008 season joining former coach Kåre Ingebrigtsen. Vikestad played a few games for Glimt over the season, but mostly played for Bodø/Glimt 2, and was a regular fixture in the second division for the second team.

In the 2009 season, Vikestad quit Glimt due to lack of motivation. He later became a player-coach at third division side Charlottenlund SK.

External links
 

1983 births
Living people
Norwegian footballers
Association football forwards
Eliteserien players
Ranheim Fotball players
FK Bodø/Glimt players